The Campeonato Pernambucano 2009 was the 95th edition of the Campeonato Pernambucano. The competition was won by Sport.

Format

Série A1 (A1 Series)

The Campeonato Pernambucano is divided into two rounds: Taça Revolução Constitucionalista de 1817 (1817 Constitutionalist Revolution Cup) and Taça Confederação do Equador (Confederation of the Equator Cup). 

In each round, the teams played once against each of the remaining teams. The champion of the round was the team that made the most points at the end of the eleven rounds. The final was played between the champions of the shifts.

The Campeonato Pernambucano will be decided in two extra matches between the winner of the two Cups. If a club win the two cups it is declared as the Campeonato Pernambucano 2009 champions.

Participating clubs

Taça Revolução Constitucionalista de 1817

Taça Confederação do Equador

General Qualification

References
 Gazeta Esportiva

2009
Pernambucano, 2009